Awake is the third studio album by the American ambient music project Tycho, released on March 18, 2014 by Ghostly International. It is the second album in a 'trilogy' by the project, beginning with Dive in 2011 and concluding with Epoch in 2016. To date it is his highest charting album in the United States peaking at 23.

Critical reception
At Metacritic, which assigns a normalized rating out of 100 to reviews from critics, the album received an average score of 69, based on 23 reviews, which indicates "generally favorable reviews".

Track listing

Personnel
Credits adapted from the liner notes of Awake.

 Scott Hansen – artwork, producer, bass, drums, guitar, keyboards, live drums engineering, mastering, mixing
 Zac Brown – bass, guitar
 Rory O'Connor – live drums, live drums engineering
 Count – live drums engineering, mastering, mixing, production consultant
 Christopher Willits – mastering, production consultant
 Ricardo Ayala – live drums, assistant engineering

Charts

Weekly charts

Year-end charts

Awake Remixes

As of September 2016 the album has sold over 70,000 copies.

In December 2015 the group announced the release of a remix album of Awake, which was released digitally on 15 January and physically in May, 2016 on Ghostly International.

Track listing

Charts

Weekly charts

References

2014 albums
Tycho (musician) albums
Ghostly International albums
Instrumental albums